Roger Lawrence Williams (June 22, 1923 – July 4, 2017), was an American historian with major interests in French political history, particularly the Second Empire associated with Napoleon III.  He served on the faculty in History departments at several universities, becoming department head at three.  He was a founding member of the Society for French Historical Studies.  In later years he developed a keen interest in botany, and wrote extensively on that subject, especially its early history in France. Williams did not marry and left his estate to the Wyoming Community Foundation.

Education
Williams graduated from Greeley High School in Greeley, Colorado, then attended Colorado College.  After an interruption to serve in the U.S. Army (1943-1946) he obtained his AB degree in 1947.  He earned his MA in 1948 and PhD in European history in 1951 at the University of Michigan.

Academic positions
Beginning his career he served as assistant professor or visiting professor at three institutions: Minnesota State University, Mankato (1950-1952), Massachusetts Institute of Technology (1952-1955), Michigan State University (1955-1956).  He then became associate professor and later History department head at Antioch College(1956-1965), and professor and subsequently head of the History Department at University of California, Santa Barbara (1965-1971).

In 1971, when offered the position of Chancellor at UC Santa Barbara, he declined, preferring to return to Wyoming,  and accepted  the position of Professor and Department Head at the University of Wyoming. He "built the department into the region’s leading history department." In 1978 he was honored with the title Distinguished Professor (UW's first such).  He retired in 1988, and became a Research Associate of the Rocky Mountain Herbarium.

Upon Williams' death, a colleague wrote of him: "Undergraduates were attracted by his high standards, carefully crafted lectures, and subtle humor. His graduate students, who now live and work throughout the United States and Canada, fondly recall his gifts as advisor and mentor."

Professional activities
History

Williams was encouraged by historian friend Jacques Barzun to explore French cultural history, which led Williams to produce a series of books on Napoleon III and the Second French Empire, and the times leading up to and following that epoch.  The first book, Gaslight and Shadow, adopted a style followed by many of his later works:  he "abandons the more orthodox chronological approach in favor of a mosaic ... of ten vignettes chosen to portray the many facets of the Second Empire".   Each chapter focuses on a person who thrived in or influenced the era - including Jacques Offenbach and Louis Pasteur. In the Preface he notes the human proclivity which often leads to times of turmoil in history: "Great wealth can patronize creativity, or it can stimulate a greed for more wealth and power."

Later books covered this period in great detail.  In a vein similar to Gaslight and Shadow, Manners and Murders in the World of Louis-Napoleon consists of a series of chapters, each "concerned with a single crime and its trial".

The Jacques Barzun Prize in Cultural History, one of two prizes awarded by the American Philosophical Society, was established and funded by Williams in 1993.

Botany

A few years before retiring as Distinguished Professor and Department Head of the University of Wyoming, Williams began his first scholarly work in botany.  In 1979 he began his biography of the botanical taxonomist Aven Nelson with help from his family;  the book was published in 1984.

A short while later he produced a treatise on botanist George Everett Osterhout  in the botanical journal Brittonia.  In 1988, using his extensive knowledge of French history, he began to delve into the beginnings of modern botany.

His 2001 book "Botanophilia in Eighteenth Century France",  consists of chapters on Carl Linnaeus, members of the De Jussieu family,  Augustin Pyramus de Candolle, the contributions of the philosopher Jean-Jacques Rousseau, and other persons and events.  The book covers a significant era in the History of botany, specifically in the area of plant taxonomy. It depicts the transformation of botany from an adjunct to medicine, into a mature science on its own merits.

He also contributed to the knowledge of the flora of the Rocky Mountains, publishing revisions of a classic identification aid.  His 2003 book, A Region of Astonishing Beauty, deals with many botanical explorers of the Rocky Mountains, including the first to explore the high country Edwin James, whose  words were used by Williams for the title.  "Williams covers every serious collector who spent even part of their collecting time in the Rocky Mountains."

Works  
French political history

Botany

References

1923 births
2017 deaths
20th-century American historians
American male non-fiction writers
University of Michigan alumni
Antioch College faculty
University of California, Santa Barbara faculty
American botanical writers
20th-century American male writers